Joshua Blake Reed (born May 1, 1980) is a former professional American football player who was a wide receiver in the National Football League (NFL) for eight seasons during the 2000s.  He played college football for Louisiana State University (LSU), earned consensus All-American honors, and was recognized as the nation's best college receiver.  He was picked by the Buffalo Bills in the second round of the 2002 NFL Draft.

Early years
Reed was born in Rayne, Louisiana.  He attended Rayne High School, and played high school football for the Rayne Mighty Wolves.

College career
Reed attended Louisiana State University, and played for coach Gerry DiNardo and coach Nick Saban's LSU Tigers football team from 1998 to 2001.  While at LSU, he was one of the most productive receivers in college football.  In only two years as a wide receiver (his freshman year he played running back for most of the season and he declared for the NFL draft after his junior season) he rewrote the SEC record books.  He holds the SEC record for receiving yardage in a game (293 vs. Alabama in 2001) and season (1,740 in 2001).  He also held the career receiving yardage record with 3,001 yards until 2002 when the record was broken by Georgia receiver Terrence Edwards.  Reed also holds the SEC season record for receiving yardage per game (145.0 in 2001) and is second in career receiving yardage per game (96.8).  He was a first-team All-Southeastern Conference (SEC) selection in 2000 and 2001, and a consensus All-American in 2001. He was awarded the Biletnikoff Award as the best wide receiver in college football in 2001.

Professional career

Buffalo Bills
Reed was drafted by the Buffalo Bills in the second round (36th overall) of the 2002 NFL Draft. In 2003, Reed replaced Peerless Price as the Bills' starting wide receiver. He caught 58 passes and two touchdowns. Reed was hospitalized for two days in November 2006 after bruising his kidney.

Reed caught 311 passes for 3,575 yards and 10 touchdowns with the Bills. He became an unrestricted free agent following the 2009 season.

San Diego Chargers
Reed was signed by the San Diego Chargers to a one-year contract on June 11, 2010.  He was released by the Chargers on September 4, 2010.

NFL statistics
Receiving statistics

See also
 List of NCAA major college football yearly receiving leaders
 LSU Tigers football statistical leaders

References

1980 births
Living people
All-American college football players
American football wide receivers
Buffalo Bills players
LSU Tigers football players
People from Rayne, Louisiana
Players of American football from Louisiana
San Diego Chargers players